The 2021 Korea Open (also known as the 2021 Hana Bank Korea Open for sponsorship purposes) was a professional women's tennis tournament played on indoor hard courts. After the cancellation of the 2020 edition, the 2021 edition was also delayed and later downgraded to WTA 125 level from WTA 250 level as a result of Covid-19 Pandemic. It was the 17th
edition of the tournament, and part of the 2021 WTA 125K series. It took place in Seoul, South Korea between 20 and 26 December 2021.

Singles main-draw entrants

Seeds 

 1 Rankings are as of December 13, 2021

Other entrants 
The following players received wildcards into the singles main draw:
  Back Da-yeon
  Brenda Fruhvirtová
  Jeong Bo-young
  Park Eun-yeong

The following player received entry as an alternate:
  Moon Jeong

Withdrawals 
Before the tournament
  Jodie Burrage → replaced by  Carol Zhao
  Hanna Chang → replaced by  Anastasia Kulikova
  Federica Di Sarra → replaced by  Peangtarn Plipuech
  Nao Hibino → replaced by  Moon Jeong
  Mai Hontama → replaced by  Riya Bhatia
  Dasha Ivanova → replaced by  Kim Da-bin
  Anna Sisková → replaced by  Linda Fruhvirtová
  Zhang Shuai → replaced by  Choi Ji-hee

Doubles main-draw entrants

Seeds 

1 Rankings are as of December 13, 2021

Other entrants 
The following pair received wildcards into the doubles main draw:
  Jeong Bo-young /  Jeong Yeong-won

Champions

Singles 

  Zhu Lin def.  Kristina Mladenovic 6–0, 6–4

Doubles 

  Choi Ji-hee /  Han Na-lae def.  Valentini Grammatikopoulou /  Réka Luca Jani 6–4, 6–4

References

External links 
 

Korea Open
Korea Open
2020s in Seoul
Korea Open (tennis)
Korea Open